Troy Michael Kropog (born July 31, 1986) is a former American football offensive tackle. He was drafted by the Tennessee Titans in the fourth round of the 2009 NFL Draft. He played college football for Tulane.

Professional career

Jacksonville Jaguars
Kropog was signed by the Jacksonville Jaguars on September 12, 2012, and released on September 15.

Minnesota Vikings
Kropog was signed to the Minnesota Vikings' practice squad on September 18, 2012.

In December 2012 Kropog was promoted to the Vikings 53 man roster after Percy Harvin was placed on the IR list. Kropog was released by the Vikings on September 1, 2013.

Washington Redskins
Kropog was signed to the Washington Redskins' practice squad on September 24, 2013.

New York Giants
Kropog was signed to the New York Giants' roster on January 7, 2014. He was released by the Giants on July 31, 2015.

External links
New York Giants bio
Tulane Green Wave bio

1986 births
Living people
People from Metairie, Louisiana
Players of American football from Louisiana
American football offensive tackles
Tulane Green Wave football players
Tennessee Titans players
Jacksonville Jaguars players
Minnesota Vikings players
Washington Redskins players
New York Giants players